Marianopolis College is a private English-language college in the Canadian province of Quebec. Located in Westmount, Quebec, it is an anglophone college with a student body over 2,000. The General and Vocational Education College, known as a CEGEP, is affiliated with the Association des collèges privés du Québec (ACPQ), Association of Canadian Community Colleges (ACCC) and Canadian Colleges Athletic Association (CCAA).

Campus
The college's current site is at 4873 Westmount Ave in Westmount, between Vendôme and Villa-Maria metro stations. The current campus contains 12 wings and includes two gyms, one fitness center, one dance studio, over four computer labs, and multiple science laboratories. Furthermore, the library was renovated in the summer of 2013 and once again in the winter of 2018, now offering a more open workspace for students with improved ventilation. A cafeteria is present on campus, as well as the general convenience store "Wayne's World". The campus also includes a large auditorium suited for conferences, concerts and presentations.

Prior to April 2007, it was situated at 3880 Côte-des-Neiges, which has been converted into a luxury apartment project known as "M sur la Montagne".

Programs
The college offers pre-university programs (not to be confused with community colleges in other provinces or in the U.S.A), which take two years to complete and cover the subject matters which roughly correspond to the additional year of high school given elsewhere in Canada and introductory first-year university curriculum in preparation for a chosen field in university. Accordingly, graduates may, in certain circumstances, receive advance credit of up to one full year in some disciplines when enrolling in universities outside the province of Quebec. However, Marianopolis does not offer technical (skilled trade) programs, nor adult (continuing) education, unlike many other colleges.

While the college primarily offers two-year pre-university programs leading to a Diploma of Collegial Studies (DEC), several three-year double-DEC programs are also available.  These programs allow students to combine music with Science, Social Science or Arts.
It constitutes one of the most prestigious CEGEPs in the province of Quebec.

History
The school inception can be traced back to Marguerite Bourgeoys, the founder of the Notre-Dame Congregation and founder of the first school in New France in 1658.

The school was founded in 1908 as the bilingual Notre Dame Ladies College, the first institution of higher learning for English-speaking Catholic women in Quebec. Initially, it offered degrees through Université Laval, the first being offered three years after the college's founding. The degree-granting agreement was later transferred to Université de Montréal. In 1926, the school was renamed Marguerite Bourgeoys College.

During the World War II era, the English sector of the college was reorganized to be in line with anglophone universities, including programs in general science and honours chemistry. It changed its name to Marianopolis College (from Greek City of Maria) (since the teaching congregation has another much older nearby secondary school named Villa Maria [1854]).

In 1967, several institutions were merged and became public ones, when the Quebec system of colleges was created. Changes to the education system in Quebec caused Marianopolis to adopt a college-level program in 1969. The college also began accepting male students during this time. The university degree-granting program was eventually phased out in 1972.  

For 30 years, Marianopolis was located near McGill University at 3647 rue Peel, where it had moved in 1945 from a previous building that was destroyed by fire. In 1975, the college relocated to a larger campus on the site of the former Sulpician school Séminaire de Philosophie, at 3880 Côte des Neiges. In 2007, Marianopolis returned to its original campus in the prestigious historic building at 4873 Westmount Av., designed by J.O. Marchand, a prominent Quebec architect of his time and creator of such architecturally significant buildings as the old Municipal Courthouse and the Peace Tower of the Parliament of Canada. The building was built first for the Institut pédagogique, a superior normal school to train female teachers and after as the mother house of the Congregation before returning to academic use. The campus’ facilities were modernized and a double gymnasium was built underground. In 2017, the College undertook the largest renovation project in its history to equip its near-century-old building with modern safety features, heating, ventilation, and air-conditioning, while upgrading teaching, learning and working spaces across campus.

Although the college remains under the authority of the Congregation of Notre-Dame, students of all faiths are admitted and the curriculum and school experience are entirely secular.

Campus life and environment

Congress and clubs
The student life at Marianopolis is supported by MSU (Marianopolis Student Union) Congress, the student government. Congress consists of a President and a Vice-President of Administrative Affairs, as well as a Vice-President of Finance and ten other coordinators, each one focusing on a specific domain. The President, Vice-President and six other members of Congress are elected by the student body at Marianopolis College; the remaining five positions are appointed. Many major events and activities regarding the ensemble of the students are organized by Congress, such events include Halloween celebrations, health week, Valentine's Day activities, and so forth.

Students may freely create their own club to practice hobbies with other fellow students or to simply attract people of similar interests together. Currently, there are approximately 100 clubs within the college ranging from dance clubs to Computer science club to Tea club. These clubs coordinate activities and meetings between members and some also benefit from Congress' monetary financing.

Athletics
The Marianopolis College athletes go by the name of the Demons. They are involved in multiple competitive sports such as volleyball, basketball, and rugby. These teams play within the RSEQ sports league.

Some student clubs also practice various other sports such as rowing, dragon boat, skiing, and tennis.

Furthermore, the fitness center and gymnasium are open to students during certain hours during the week for them to work out.

Academic programs
Each Marianopolis student is required to complete a set of general courses in addition to those required by the program into which they have been admitted.

Academic programs
 Sciences
 Health Science
 Pure & Applied Science
 Arts and Sciences
 Social Science & Commerce
 General
 Global Studies and International Affairs
 Law Society and Justice
 Psychology
 Commerce
 Math and Finance
 Arts, Literature and Communication
 Liberal Arts
 Music & Music Double-DECs
 Music/Science
 Music/Social Science
 Music/Arts, Literature and Communication

Academic certificates
Additionally, there are various certificate programs, which interested students need to apply for once admitted to Marianopolis. These are considered honours programs and require additional co-curricular work such as a thesis or research project, and/or that certain classes be taken. The current certificate programs include:
 Honours Commerce
 Honours Social Science
 Honours Science
 International Studies Certificate
 Law and Social Justice
 Third World Studies Certificate
 Environmental Studies Certificate
 Native Studies Certificate
 Gender Studies Certificate

Alumni

Notable Marianopolis alumni include:
 Juanita Westmoreland-Traoré, OQ '63, Canada's first black law school dean
 Nicole Duval Hesler '64, Quebec's first female Chief Justice
 Louise Pagotto '71, Chancellor, Kapi'olani Community College
 Brian Fetherstonhaugh '76, Chief Talent Officer and CEO, OgilvyOne Worldwide
 Corey Hart '79, singer of the hit single "Sunglasses at Night"
 Monique Polak '79, Young Adult fiction writer
 Dr. Beatrice Wang '83, leading dermatologist
 Christine Jones '85, Tony award-winning scenic designer
 Dr. Avi Wallerstein '85, co-founder of LASIK MD
 Ted Ty '87, animator (The Lion King, Mulan, Lilo & Stitch, Kung Fu Panda)
 Andras Schreck ‘87, Judge of the Ontario Superior Court of Justice
 Sean Devine '89, actor, playwright, and politician
 Dr. Kosar Khwaja '94, director of acute care surgery at McGill, 1994 Loran Scholar and assistant physician to the Montreal Canadiens
 Sugar Sammy '95, comedian
 Caroline Issa '96, Chief Executive and Fashion Director, Tank magazine
 Reuben Kobulnik '97, Operating Partner, Valar Ventures (Venture Capital)
 Mylène Dinh-Robic '97, actress, voice-over artist
 Erdem Moralıoğlu '97, fashion designer
 Chester (Chet) Doxas '99, member of the award-winning Sam Roberts Band
 Antoni Porowski '03, television personality, Queer Eye
 Simon Tian ‘12, businessman and entrepreneur
 Nicholas Johnson '16, first black valedictorian of Princeton University, attended for one year
 Iakoiehwahtha Patton ‘18, Mohawk academic and activist

See also
 List of colleges in Quebec
 Higher education in Quebec
 English-language colleges
 Champlain
 Dawson College
 Heritage
 John Abbott College
 Vanier College
 TAV College

References

External links
 Marianopolis College Website
 Marianopolis College Omnivox Website

Private colleges in Quebec
Educational institutions established in 1908
Education in Westmount, Quebec
Universities and colleges in Montreal
Colleges in Quebec
1908 establishments in Quebec
Romanesque Revival architecture in Canada